Runcu may refer to several places in Romania:

 Runcu, Dâmbovița, a commune in Dâmbovița County
 Runcu, Gorj, a commune in Gorj County
 Runcu, Vâlcea, a commune in Vâlcea County
 Runcu, a village in Pârscov Commune, Buzău County
 Runcu, a village in Pantelimon Commune, Constanța County
 Runcu, a village in Țibana Commune, Iași County
 Runcu, a village in Dascălu Commune, Ilfov County
 Runcu, a village in Cacica Commune, Suceava County
 Runcu, a district in the town of Buhuși, Bacău County
 Runcu, a tributary of the Lotru in Vâlcea County
 Runcu, a tributary of the Râul Mare in Hunedoara County

See also
 Runc (disambiguation)